Princess Gyeongnyeong was a Goryeo Royal Princess as the second and youngest daughter of King Sinjong and Queen Seonjeong, also the youngest sister of King Huijong, Duke Yangyang, and Princess Hyohoe.

It seems that she was born around the 12th century based on the fact that in 1199 she formally became a Princess (공주, 公主) when her older sister, Princess Hyohoe died at 17 years old. Later, in 1201, she married Wang-Jeong (왕정) and was given royal title Count Siheung (시흥백), later becoming Duke Hoean (회안공). With him, she had 3 sons and their second son later married Princess Suheung who was her grandniece. Wang-Jeong was the descendant of Wang-Gi, Duke Pyeongyang (왕기 평양공), King Hyeonjong's son. The Princess seems to have died around the 13th century, and her husband died in 1234.

Family
Father: Sinjong of Goryeo (고려 신종; 1144–1204)
Grandfather: Injong of Goryeo (고려 인종; 1109–1146)
Grandmother: Queen Gongye (공예왕후; 1109–1183)
Mother: Queen Seonjeong (선정왕후; d. 1222)
Grandfather: Wang-On, Duke Gangneung (왕온 강릉공; d. 1146)
Grandmother: Lady Gim (부인 김씨)
Older brother: Huijong of Goryeo (고려 희종; 1181–1237)
Older brother: Wang Seo, Duke Yangyang (왕서 양양공)
Older sister: Princess Hyohoe (효회공주; 1183–1199)
Husband: Wang-Jeong, Duke Hoean (왕정 회안공; d. 1234); son of Wang-Jin, Marquess Yeongin and Princess Yeonhui.
Son: Wang-Yeon, Marquess Gyeyang (왕연 계양후)
Son: Wang-Jeon, Duke Sinyang (왕전 신양공; d. 1256) – married Princess Suheung.
Son: Wang-Si (왕시)

References

Year of birth unknown
Year of death unknown
Goryeo princesses